The 2008 OFC Nations Cup was the eighth edition of the OFC Nations Cup and the first under a new format. It took place as a series of as a home-and-away round-robin tournament on FIFA match dates in 2007 and 2008. Doubling as the qualification tournament for the 2010 FIFA World Cup, the tournament was substantially different from earlier editions: 2004 champions Australia did not compete after leaving the Oceania Football Confederation for the Asian Football Confederation and for the first time since the 1996 OFC Nations Cup, no fixed venue was used. Unlike the 2004 OFC Nations Cup, which had featured six teams from the Oceania Football Confederation, the 2008 tournament had just four.

The cup was won by New Zealand, who as a result qualified for the 2009 FIFA Confederations Cup in South Africa and the World Cup qualifying play-off with the Asian 5th-placed team, Bahrain, in which New Zealand were successful.

Participating teams

The four qualified teams for the 2008 OFC Nations Cup were:

 (automatic qualifier)
 (gold medalists at the 2007 South Pacific Games)
 (silver medalists at the 2007 South Pacific Games)
 (bronze medalists at the 2007 South Pacific Games)

Squads
See 2008 OFC Nations Cup squads

Final tournament

Ranking

Results

Notes

Goalscorers
There were 39 goals scored in 12 games, for an average of 3.25 goals per game. Players in bold advanced to the next round in qualifying.

8 goals
 Shane Smeltz (NZL)

5 goals
 Michel Hmaé (NCL)

3 goals
 David Mulligan (NZL)

2 goals

 Maciu Dunadamu (FIJ)
 Roy Krishna (FIJ)
 Osea Vakatalesau (FIJ)
 Pierre Wajoka (NCL)
 Francois Sakama (VAN)

1 goal

 Salesh Kumar (FIJ)
 Valerio Nawatu (FIJ)
 Patrick Diaike (NCL)
 Ramon Djamali (NCL)
 Ramon Gjamaci (NCL)
 Mael Kaudre (NCL)
 Marius Mapou (NCL)
 Jeremy Christie (NZL)
 Ben Sigmund (NZL)
 Ivan Vicelich (NZL)
 Derek Malas (VAN)
 Etienne Mermer (VAN)
 Jean Nako Naprapol (VAN)

References

External links
 RSSSF.  Accessed 21 February 2010.

 
Nations
2008
2nd Round
New Zealand at the 2010 FIFA World Cup
2007–08 in New Zealand association football

pl:Mistrzostwa Świata w Piłce Nożnej 2010 (eliminacje strefy OFC)#Runda druga - Puchar Narodów Oceanii 2008